Thomas Frederik Smith (born 21 May 1996) is an English cricketer who played for Glamorgan. Primarily a right-handed batsman, he also bowls right-arm off break. He made his Twenty20 debut for the Marylebone Cricket Club in the 2018 MCC Tri-Nation Series against Nepal on 29 July 2018.

References

External links
 

1996 births
Living people
English cricketers
Cricketers from Bristol
Glamorgan cricketers
Marylebone Cricket Club cricketers
Dorset cricketers
Wales National County cricketers